The 1924 Baylor Bears football team represented the Baylor University in the 1924 college football season. In their 5th year under head coach Frank Bridges, the Bears compiled a 7–2–1 record (4–0–1 against conference opponents), won the Southwest Conference championship, and outscored their opponents by a combined total of 149 wins and 66 losses.

No Bears were recognized as All-Americans, and five Bears received all-conference honors: Jack Sisco, Homer "Bear" Walker, Sam Coates, Ralph Pittman, Bill Coffey.

It would be 50 years before Baylor would win another football conference championship, doing so in 1974.

Schedule

References

Baylor
Baylor Bears football seasons
Southwest Conference football champion seasons
Baylor Bears football